William Henry Jeffreys Jr. (December 17, 1871 – June 3, 1938) was an American Democratic politician who served as a member of the Virginia Senate from 1916 to 1932.

References

External links

1871 births
1938 deaths
Democratic Party Virginia state senators